Ford & Fairview is a bus rapid transit station on the Metro A Line in Saint Paul, Minnesota.

The station is located at the intersection of Fairview Avenue on Ford Parkway. Both station platforms are located far-side of Fairview Avenue.

The station opened June 11, 2016 with the rest of the A Line.

Bus connections
 Route 84 - Snelling Avenue - Highland Village - Sibley Plaza
Route 84 providing local service on Snelling Avenue shares platforms with the A Line.

Notable places nearby
Highland Park, Saint Paul

References

External links 
 Metro Transit: Ford & Fairview Station

Bus stations in Minnesota